The Costa Rica women's national football team has represented Costa Rica at the FIFA Women's World Cup on one occasion, in 2015.

FIFA Women's World Cup record

*Draws include knockout matches decided on penalty kicks.

Record by opponent

2015 FIFA Women's World Cup

Group E

2023 FIFA Women's World Cup

Group C

Goalscorers

References

 
Countries at the FIFA Women's World Cup